Thomas Eadie (April 8, 1887 – November 14, 1974) was a United States Navy diver and a recipient of America's highest military decoration - the Medal of Honor.

Biography
Thomas Eadie was born on April 8, 1887 in Glasgow, Scotland. He enlisted in the United States Navy on July 6, 1905 and was eventually rated as a Gunner's Mate and was also trained as a diver.

Eadie retired from active duty on February 1, 1939.  He returned to active service during World War II on April 30, 1942, receiving appointment as Chief Gunner (Warrant Officer). He was promoted to ensign on August 15, 1942 and to lieutenant on July 1, 1944. He retired with that rank in September 1946.

Thomas Eadie died at Brockton, Massachusetts, on November 14, 1974 and was buried in Island Cemetery annex in Newport, Rhode Island.  There is a plaque in his honor at the First Presbyterian Church in Newport and Eadie Street in Newport is named after him.

Award citations

Medal of Honor citation
The official Medal of Honor citation for Chief Gunner's Mate Thomas Eadie is as follows:
For display of extraordinary heroism in the line of his profession above and beyond the call of duty on 18 December 1927, during the diving operations in connection with the sinking of the U.S.S. S-4 with all on board, as a result of a collision off Provincetown, Mass. On this occasion when MICHELS, Chief Torpedoman, United States Navy, while attempting to connect an air line to the submarine at a depth of 102 feet became seriously fouled, EADIE, under the most adverse diving conditions, deliberately, knowingly and willingly took his own life in his hands by promptly descending to the rescue in response to the desperate need of his companion diver. After two hours of extremely dangerous and heartbreaking work, by his cool, calculating and skillful labors, he succeeded in his mission and brought MICHELS safely to the surface.

1st Navy Cross
The official citation for Chief Gunner's Mate Thomas Eadie's first Navy Cross is as follows:
For extraordinary heroism and devotion to duty on the occasion of the salvaging of the U.S.S. S-51.

2nd Navy Cross
The official citation for Chief Gunner's Mate Thomas Eadie's second Navy Cross is as follows:
For extraordinary heroism and fearless devotion to duty during the diving operations in connection with the salvage of the U.S.S. S-4 sunk as a result of a collision off Provincetown, Massachusetts, 17 December 1927. During the period, 17 December 1927 to 17 March 1928, on which latter date the ill-fated vessel was raised, Eadie, under the most adverse weather conditions, at the risk of his life, descended many times into the icy waters and displayed throughout that fortitude, skill, determination and courage which characterizes conduct above and beyond the call of duty.

In addition to the above, Eadie also received the Navy Good Conduct Medal, Victory Medal, American Campaign Medal and World War Two Victory Medal.

See also

List of Medal of Honor recipients
List of Medal of Honor recipients during Peacetime

References

1887 births
1974 deaths
United States Navy Medal of Honor recipients
United States Navy officers
Recipients of the Navy Cross (United States)
United States Navy personnel of World War I
Scottish-born Medal of Honor recipients
Military personnel from Glasgow
Non-combat recipients of the Medal of Honor
Burials in Rhode Island